Boli is a county of southeastern Heilongjiang province, People's Republic of China.

Administrative divisions 

There are five subdistricts, five towns and five townships in the county:

Subdistricts (街道) 
Xinqi Subdistrict
Xinhua Subdistrict
Yuanming Subdistrict
Tiexi Subdistrict
Chengxi Subdistrict

Towns (镇) 
Boli
Woken
Shuanghe
Xiaowuzhan
Dasizhan

Townships (乡) 
Qingshan Township
Yongheng Township
Qiangken Township
Xingshu Korean Ethnic Township
Jixing Korean and Manchu Ethnic Township

Demographics 

Climate

Notes and references 

Boli